Roy Campbell may refer to:

Roy Campbell (poet) (1901–1957), South African poet
Roy Campbell Jr. (1952–2014), American jazz musician
Roy Edward Campbell, American Catholic bishop
Roy H. Campbell, computer scientist
Colonel Roy Campbell, character in the Metal Gear series of video games

See also
Roy Campbell-Moore (born 1951), Scottish dancer and choreographer